Perth FM 104.9 was a radio station in Perth, Western Australia. It was part of the CAMG Media Group and broadcast primarily in Mandarin. It broadcast from 12:00–22:00 local time. For the remainder of time broadcasting was covered by Perth Chinese Radio FM 90.5. From 1 January 2017 the frequency for FM 104.9 was decommissioned and only the FM 90.5 frequency is being used.

Its 50W transmitter is sited in Yokine, a suburb of Perth. The station launched on 17 June 2007.

Perth FM 90.5 is another Perth radio station, also part of the CAMG Media Group. This station broadcast primarily in English, relaying China Radio International. From 1 January 2016, it started simulcasting with FM 104.9 and no longer broadcasts the English channel.

Its 5 kW transmitter is sited in Bickley, another suburb of Perth.

External links
 Reciva info on CRI Perth 104.9
 Official CRI Perth 104.9 schedule

Radio stations in Perth, Western Australia
Chinese-Australian culture
China Radio International
Overseas Chinese organisations